FC Alga-2 Bishkek is a Kyrgyzstani football club based in Bishkek, Kyrgyzstan that played in the first division in Kyrgyzstan, the Kyrgyzstan First League.

History 
19??: Founded as FC Alga-d Frunze.
1993: Renamed FC Alga Bishkek.
1994: Merged with FC Alga-RIIF Bishkek to FC Alga Bishkek.
1994: Renamed FC Alga-2 Bishkek.

Achievements 
Kyrgyzstan League:
5th: 1993

Kyrgyzstan Cup:

Current squad

External links 
Career stats by KLISF

Football clubs in Kyrgyzstan
Football clubs in Bishkek